XHHTS-FM is a radio station on 90.7 FM in Tapachula, Chiapas. It is known as Extremo and carries an adult contemporary format.

History
XHHTS received its concession on November 16, 1988. It was owned by Radio Núcleo owner Francisco Siman Estefan.

References

Radio stations in Chiapas